Erwin Espinosa (born 27 July 1954) is a Bolivian former footballer. He played in seven matches for the Bolivia national football team from 1979 to 1985. He was also part of Bolivia's squad for the 1979 Copa América tournament.

References

External links
 

1954 births
Living people
Bolivian footballers
Bolivia international footballers
Place of birth missing (living people)
Association football defenders
Oriente Petrolero players